Brad Barron Renfro (July 25, 1982 – January 15, 2008) was an American actor. He made his film debut at age 11 with a starring role in The Client (1994). He went on to appear in 21 feature films and won several awards. 

Prior to being cast in The Client, Renfro had no acting background and was living with his grandmother in a trailer park. Wanting to cast a "tough kid" who had the life experience to understand the character he would portray, director Joel Schumacher chose Renfro to play the role of Mark Sway. Renfro soon attracted a large fanbase as he continued to star in movies like The Cure, Tom and Huck, Sleepers, Apt Pupil,  Bully and Ghost World.

Beginning in the late 1990s, Renfro experienced difficulties in his private life, including drug addiction and a series of arrests. He died at age 25 of acute heroin and morphine intoxication.

Early childhood
Renfro was born on July 25, 1982, in Knoxville, Tennessee, the son of Angela Denise Olsen (née McCrory) and Mark Renfro, a factory worker. He was raised from the age of five by his paternal grandmother, Joanne Renfro, a church secretary, after his parents divorced. He reportedly did not have a close relationship with his father.

Acting career

When he was 10 years of age, Renfro was discovered by Mali Finn, a casting director for Joel Schumacher. Renfro was recommended to Finn by a former D.A.R.E. officer of his, who was captivated by his charm and street smarts. He had no prior acting experience or training at the time. Finn had contacted various agencies that worked with youth; she was looking to cast a "tough" kid and settled on Renfro after looking at five thousand such boys all over the United States. At the time, Renfro had been living in a trailer park outside Knoxville with his grandmother. "I wanted a kid who understood in the marrow of his psyche what it was like to grow up too soon," Schumacher later told The New York Times.

Renfro was cast by Finn in the lead role of Mark Sway in Schumacher's The Client. His casting was announced in May 1993, and the movie was filmed in the summer of that year. Based on the bestselling John Grisham novel, The Client became one of the top-grossing films of 1994. In 1995, Renfro won The Hollywood Reporters "Young Star" award, and was nominated as one of People magazine's "Top 30 Under 30."

Renfro played Huckleberry Finn in 1995's Tom and Huck. He also won a second "Young Star" award, as well as a "Young Artist" award, for his performance in The Cure.

In 1996, Renfro appeared in Sleepers, which was based on the novel of the same name by Lorenzo Carcaterra. The film was directed by Barry Levinson and Renfro played the younger version of co-star Brad Pitt's character.

In 1997, he starred in Telling Lies in America, directed by Guy Ferland.

In 1998, he starred in Apt Pupil, directed by Bryan Singer, for which he won the Best Actor award at Tokyo International Film Festival and was also nominated for a Saturn Award. The several films he starred in that followed gained little attention, with the majority going straight to video. He played Leon S. Kennedy in a live-action ad for Resident Evil 2, which aired in Japan. Renfro went on to act in other films, including 2001's Ghost World, Bully, Happy Campers, Tart; 2002's American Girl; and 2005's The Jacket. He also appeared in the 2006 Law & Order: Criminal Intent episode "Watch" and completed filming on the film The Informers.

Renfro appeared in the first version of the music video for the 10 Years song "Wasteland"; his cousin, Jesse Hasek, is the band's lead singer. He was also featured in the video for the N.E.R.D song "Provider", playing the part of a petty drug dealer.

Personal life
Renfro had one child, a son born in 2003 in Japan, and raised there by his mother, a Japanese citizen. Prior to Renfro's death, the public had been unaware he had a son, and mention of him did not appear in his obituary, though his son was eventually named in the obituary of Renfro's mother, Angela, who died in 2012.

Substance abuse and criminal record

On June 3, 1998, Renfro, then 15, and his 19-year-old cousin were arrested and charged with drug possession. He was carrying two small bags of cocaine in a cigarette box and a bag of marijuana in his sock. He entered into a plea bargain in which he agreed to random drug tests.

By the age of 18, Renfro had already been in drug rehabilitation more than once.

On August 28, 2000, Renfro and a friend attempted to steal a yacht from the Fort Lauderdale harbor. Renfro was charged with grand theft and criminal mischief; in January 2001, he was sentenced to two years' probation and ordered to pay investigative costs and yacht repair costs. Renfro violated his probation in May 2001 when he was arrested for underage drinking. On January 14, 2002, Renfro violated his probation again and was arrested on charges of public intoxication and driving without a valid license in Knoxville. He was placed into a three-month substance abuse treatment program as a result.

On November 24, 2005, Renfro was charged with a misdemeanor count of driving under the influence and two counts of driving with a suspended license, leading to 10 days in jail and 18 months of alcohol education classes. He was arrested by LAPD officers on December 22, 2005, during an undercover drug sweep of Skid Row. Following that arrest, he was charged with attempted possession of heroin. A photograph showing him in handcuffs made the front page of the Los Angeles Times. Renfro admitted to a detective that he was using heroin and methadone. He pleaded guilty, was sentenced to three years' probation, and was fined $450. In May 2006, he spent 10 days in jail for driving while under the influence and attempted heroin possession.

In June 2007, Renfro was found to have violated his probation by failing to enroll in a long-term drug treatment program. A judge warned him that if he violated probation two more times, he could be sentenced to a live-in rehabilitation program or to jail.

Following Renfro's death in January 2008, Hasek stated that Renfro and his son had visited him several days earlier and that Renfro had made positive changes in his life. According to Hasek, "He had hit rock bottom and had come way back up."

Death 
Renfro was found dead on January 15, 2008, in his Los Angeles apartment. He was 25 years old. His body was returned to Tennessee, where he was buried on January 22, 2008, at Red House Cemetery in the small community of Blaine, Tennessee. On February 8, 2008, the Los Angeles County Coroner's office ruled his death accidental, attributing it to acute heroin/morphine intoxication.
 
Seventeen days after Renfro's death, his grandmother Joanne—who had accompanied him regularly during his early acting career—died at her home at the age of 76. Local officials said she died of natural causes.

Legacy
Renfro was omitted from the "In Memoriam" tribute montage at the 80th Academy Awards in the year following his death. Perceived by the press as a "snub", Renfro's omission from the Oscars received widespread media coverage.

Renfro's roommate, Mark Foster of Foster the People, wrote a song about his death called "Downtown". The song was included on a deluxe edition of the band's 2011 debut album Torches.

In 2012, the art magazine The Thing Quarterly reported that actor James Franco had the name "Brad" tattooed on his right shoulder in memory of Renfro. Franco also produced a limited-edition series of switchblades bearing the words "Brad Renfro" and "Forever."

Role of film industry in Renfro's struggles
In 2018, ten years after Renfro's death, and again the following year, the website BuzzFeed devoted a long article to recounting his rise and descent. The article discussed whether the film industry adequately protects the welfare of at-risk child actors. BuzzFeed found no evidence that laws or contractual provisions had been violated on Renfro's films, but suggested that the industry had failed the actor by not ensuring that he was appropriately supervised when he was off the movie set.

Fernando Altschul, the first assistant director of Apt Pupil, told BuzzFeed that he saw a 14-year-old Renfro at an on-set party where alcohol was available. According to Altschul, Renfro was the only underage attendee.

During Renfro's early career, his worldliness and self-confidence caused many adults who came into contact with him to believe that he was some years older than his actual age. Gemma Jackson, production designer on Tom and Huck, remembered Renfro as being 15 or 16 years of age during filming when he was actually 13. Jackson recounted to BuzzFeed that during production, Renfro had a girlfriend who was several years his senior. Renfro developed an ardent following among adolescent girls; Peter Horton, director of The Cure, recalled that the actor—who had just turned 12—received cards from local girls that contained sexually suggestive messages.

Renfro's apparent maturity was reflected in his onscreen portrayals. In his early roles, he was often sexualized and shown shirtless. In Apt Pupil, he was shown showering. He also performed scenes with sexual and violent content.

Filmography

Film

Television

Music videos

Awards and nominations

See also

 List of people from Knoxville, Tennessee

References

External links
 
 Obituary in The Times, January 18, 2008
 Brad Renfro: The End, January 27, 2008
 911 call regarding Renfro's overdose and death
 

1982 births
2008 deaths
20th-century American male actors
21st-century American male actors
Accidental deaths in California
Male actors from Los Angeles
Male actors from Tennessee
American male child actors
American male film actors
American male television actors
Burials in Tennessee
Deaths by heroin overdose in California
Drug-related deaths in California
American people convicted of drug offenses
American people convicted of theft
People from Knoxville, Tennessee